Fernando Madeira (born 12 May 1932) is a Portuguese former freestyle swimmer. He competed in two events and the water polo tournament at the 1952 Summer Olympics.

References

External links
 

1932 births
Living people
Portuguese male freestyle swimmers
Portuguese male water polo players
Olympic swimmers of Portugal
Olympic water polo players of Portugal
Swimmers at the 1952 Summer Olympics
Water polo players at the 1952 Summer Olympics
People from Oeiras, Portugal
Sportspeople from Lisbon District
20th-century Portuguese people
21st-century Portuguese people